Sir Theodosius Edward Allesley Boughton (1760 – 30 August 1780) was a British aristocrat who was the 7th Boughton baronet of Lawford.  Boughton was poisoned by his brother-in-law in what became a famous murder case in the United Kingdom.

The motive for the Boughton murder was probably money.  When Boughton became an adult at age 21, he was due to receive a large fortune.  However, if he died before then, it would all go to his sister.  Boughton lived at Lawford Hall, Little Lawford, near Rugby with his mother, sister, and brother-in-law, Captain John Donellan.  Donellan was known as "Diamond" Donellan because of a large diamond he had brought back to England from India.

Around 30 August 1780, while he was still under age 21, Boughton had become severely ill and was bedridden. His mother brought him a beverage to drink; he said it tasted bad, but drank it anyway.  Boughton died soon afterwards.

After Boughton's funeral, suspicions arose as to the cause of his death.  The body was exhumed and examined.  A Coroner's inquest ruled that Boughton's cause of death was poisoning and returned a verdict of murder against Donellan. Despite the preponderance of circumstantial evidence, and Donellan's claims of innocence, he was convicted, condemned and executed on 2 April 1781.

Boughton's widowed sister subsequently married Sir Egerton Leigh Bt, 2nd Baronet (1762-1818).

The title was inherited by a half cousin, (grandson of the 4th Baronet by his second wife Catherine), Sir Edward Boughton, 8th Baronet, who sold Lawford Hall (later demolished) and the Warwickshire estate in 1793.

References

Further reading
Rugby:past and present, with an historical account of neighbouring parishes. Rev W.O. Waite (1893) - contains a lengthy description of the case between pages  241 (219) & 255 (233). 
 Cooke, Elizabeth (2011). The damnation of John Donellan :a mysterious case of death and scandal in Georgian England. Profile. .

1760 births
1780 deaths
Baronets in the Baronetage of England
British murder victims
Deaths by poisoning